Parathyris is a genus of moths in the family Erebidae.

Species
Parathyris cedonulli
Parathyris semivitrea

References
Natural History Museum Lepidoptera generic names catalog

Phaegopterina
Moth genera